Frontiers in Cardiovascular Medicine is a peer-reviewed open access scientific journal covering all aspects of cardiology and vascular medicine in 20 sections. It was established in 2014 and is published by Frontiers Media. The editors-in-chief are Masanori Aikawa (Brigham and Women's Hospital, Harvard Medical School) and Hendrik Tevaearai Stahel (Berne University Hospital).

Abstracting and indexing
The journal is abstracted and indexed in Embase/Excerpta Medica, Science Citation Index Expanded, and Scopus.

According to the Journal Citation Reports, the journal had a 2021 impact factor of 6.050.

References

External links

English-language journals
Cardiology journals
Open access journals
Publications established in 2014
Frontiers Media academic journals